The 1996 Canadian census was a detailed enumeration of the Canadian population. Census day was May 14, 1996. On that day, Statistics Canada attempted to count every person in Canada. The total population count of Canada was 28,846,761. This was a 5.7% increase over the 1991 census of 27,296,859.

The previous census was the 1991 census and the following census was in 2001 census.

Canada by the numbers

A summary of information about Canada.

Population by province

Demographics

Mother tongue
Population by mother tongue of Canada's official languages:

Aboriginal peoples
Population of Aboriginal peoples in Canada:

Ethnic origin

Population by ethnic origin. Only those origins with more than 250,000 respondents are included here.  This is based entirely on self reporting.

Visible minorities

Age
Population by age:

See also

List of population of Canada by years
Demographics of Canada
Ethnic groups in Canada
History of immigration to Canada

References

External links
1996 Census - Statistics Canada's page on the 1996 census.

Census
1996 censuses
Censuses in Canada